The Dhiyamigili dynasty was the fifth royal dynasty to rule over the Maldives. It comprised four sultans: 
 Sultan Muzaffar Muhammad Imaduddin II (1704–1720)
 Sultan Ibrahim Iskandar II (1720–1750)
 Sultan Mukarram Muhammad Imaduddin III (1750–1757)
 Amina I (1753 after the abduction of former Sultan)
 Amina II (1757-1759)
 Sultan Al-Haj Muhammed Ghiya'as ud-din Iskandar Sri Kula Sundara Maha Radun (1766–1774)

The Dhiyamigili dynasty was deposed by the Huraa dynasty in 1774.

The consorts of the early Dhiyamigili royal ladies were possibly descended from the short-lived royal house of Isdu. There is however no documented evidence to establish this as of yet.

OTHER NOTABLE FIGURES
 Prince Abdulla
 Senfa rendi Kabafa’an
 Kakaagey Mohamed Rannabadeyri Kilegefaan
 Sultan Shamsuddin III
 President Ibrahim Nasir
 King Mohamed Fareed Didi
 Sharifa Ismail

See also
List of Sultans of the Maldives
List of Sunni Muslim dynasties

References

Maldivian dynasties